Inhaúma is a municipality in the state of Minas Gerais in the Southeast region of Brazil.

A long time ago, back when Inhaúma used to be only a fragment from Sete Lagoas (the largest town that's close to the actual municipality), there was this small bar (boteco, vulgo Copo Sujo), in which had this very attractive lady named Inhá who used to be the owner and also the bartender and people kept saying to her: "Inhá, uma!" that literally meant "Inhá, one!" (asking for a drink).

This became very popular and sooner enough, everybody knew around as "Inhaúma" and then people decided to name it that way, because most of Inhaúma's politicians and locals were and still are proud alcoholics.

See also
List of municipalities in Minas Gerais

References

Municipalities in Minas Gerais